Gastrocotyle is a genus of flowering plants belonging to the family Boraginaceae.

Its native range is Southeastern Europe to Northwestern India.

Species:

Gastrocotyle hispida 
Gastrocotyle macedonica 
Gastrocotyle natolica

References

Boraginaceae
Boraginaceae genera
Taxa named by Alexander von Bunge